
Gmina Iwaniska is a rural gmina (administrative district) in Opatów County, Świętokrzyskie Voivodeship, in south-central Poland.

Villages
Gmina Iwaniska contains the villages and settlements of Boduszów, Borków, Dziewiątle, Garbowice, Gryzikamień, Haliszka, Iwaniska, Jastrzębska Wola, Kamieniec, Kamienna Góra, Kopiec, Krępa, Kujawy, Łopatno, Marianów, Mydłów, Nowa Łagowica, Planta, Podzaldów, Przepiórów, Radwan, Skolankowska Wola, Sobiekurów, Stara Łagowica, Stobiec, Tęcza, Toporów, Ujazd, Wojnowice, Wygiełzów, Wzory, Zaldów and Zielonka.

Neighbouring gminas
Gmina Iwaniska is bordered by the gminas of Baćkowice, Bogoria, Klimontów, Łagów, Lipnik, Opatów and Raków.

References
Polish official population figures 2006

Iwaniska
Opatów County